Brachodes is a genus of moths in the family Brachodidae.

Selected species
Brachodes albina
Brachodes anatolicus
Brachodes appendiculata
Brachodes bellicosus
Brachodes beryti
Brachodes buxeus
Brachodes candefactus
Brachodes canonitis
Brachodes compar
Brachodes fallax
Brachodes flagellatus
Brachodes flavescens
Brachodes formosa
Brachodes fulgurita
Brachodes funebris
Brachodes gressitti
Brachodes infanda
Brachodes keredjella
Brachodes laeta
Brachodes lucida
Brachodes mesopotamica
Brachodes metaspila
Brachodes monotona
Brachodes nana
Brachodes nanetta
Brachodes neglectus
Brachodes nycteropis
Brachodes orientalis
Brachodes paghmanus
Brachodes powelli
Brachodes pumila
Brachodes quiris
Brachodes rasata
Brachodes rhagensis
Brachodes staudingeri
Brachodes straminella
Brachodes tristis

References

 
Brachodidae